The Minister of Foreign Affairs of the Kingdom of Tonga is a cabinet minister in charge of the Ministry of Foreign Affairs of Tonga. It is responsible for conducting foreign relations of the country.

The current Minister of Foreign Affairs is Fekitamoeloa ʻUtoikamanu, who has served since 28 December 2021.

Description of the office
Like other ministers, the Foreign Minister is formally appointed by the King on the nomination of the Prime Minister, and is responsible to both the Prime Minister and the Legislative Assembly. The position may be held independently, or in conjunction with other ministerial responsibilities. From time to time, the Prime Minister has simultaneously served as Foreign Minister.

List of ministers
Political parties

Other factions

Symbols

† Died in office

The following is a list of foreign ministers of Tonga since the country gained independence in 1970:

Notes

References

Politics of Tonga
Government of Tonga
Tonga
 
Foreign Minister
1970 establishments in Tonga